Colloquium may refer to:

An academic seminar usually led by a different lecturer and on a different topic at each meeting or similarly to a tutorial led by students as is the case in Norway.
A form of testing and assessing students' knowledge in the education system, mainly in universities.
The Parliament of Scotland, called a "colloquium" in Latin records
Any musical piece celebrating birth or distribution of good news, a hymn (antonyms: requiem, coronach)
The part of a complaint for defamation in which the plaintiff avers that the defamatory remarks related to him or her

See also
 Symposium (disambiguation)
 Colloquy (disambiguation)